The 2019–20 USC Trojans men's basketball team represented the University of Southern California during the 2019–20 NCAA Division I men's basketball season. Led by seventh-year head coach Andy Enfield, they played their home games at the Galen Center in Los Angeles, California as members of the Pac-12 Conference. They finished the season 22–9, 11–7 in Pac-12 play to finish in a tie for third place. They were set to take on Arizona in the quarterfinals of the Pac-12 tournament. However, the remainder of the Pac-12 tournament, and all other postseason tournaments, were cancelled amid the COVID-19 pandemic.

Previous season
The 2018–19 USC Trojans finished the season 16–17, 8–10 in Pac-12 Conference play. As the No. 8 seed in the 2019 Pac-12 Conference tournament, the Trojans defeated the No. 9 seed Arizona Wildcats in the first round before losing to the No. 1 seed Washington Huskies in the second round. The Trojans were not selected for any postseason play.

Off-season

Departures

Incoming transfers

2019 recruiting class

Roster

 Dec. 16, 2019 – Redshirt Sophomore forward, Charles O'Bannon Jr. elected to transfer.

Exhibition
On July 31, 2019, it was announced that USC will play Villanova on October 18, 2019, in an exhibition game. The game, which did not count towards the regular season record, took place at Galen Center, USC's home arena. All proceeds went to the California Fire Foundation. It was USC's first exhibition game open to the public since 2014.

Schedule and results

|-
!colspan=9 style=| Exhibition 

|-
!colspan=9 style=| Non-conference regular season

|-
!colspan=9 style=| Pac-12 regular season

|-
!colspan=9 style=| Pac-12 tournament
|- style="background:#bbbbbb"
| style="text-align:center"|March 12, 20202:30 pm, P12N
| style="text-align:center"| (4)
| vs. (5) ArizonaQuarterfinals
| colspan=5 rowspan=1 style="text-align:center"|Cancelled due to the COVID-19 pandemic
| style="text-align:center"|T-Mobile ArenaParadise, NV
|-

References

USC Trojans men's basketball seasons
Usc
USC Trojans basketball, men
USC Trojans basketball, men
USC Trojans basketball, men
USC Trojans basketball, men